Gachineh-ye Pain (also Romanized as Gachīneh-ye Pā’īn; also known as Gachīneh) is a village in Bemani Rural District, Byaban District, Minab County, Hormozgan Province, Iran. At the 2006 census, its population was 247, in 44 families.

References 

Populated places in Minab County